Asad,  sometimes written as Assad, is an Arabic male given name literally meaning "lion". It is used in nicknames such as Asad Allāh, one of the by-names for Ali ibn Abi Talib.

People
Among prominent people named Asad, "Assad" are:

 Asad Rustum, a Lebanese historian, academic and writer
 Asad Ahmad, journalist for BBC News and newsreader for BBC London
 Audrey Assad, an American singer-songwriter and Contemporary Christian music artist
 Asadullah (disambiguation), meaning Lion of God, may refer to several people
 Asad ibn Hashim, maternal grandfather of Ali ibn Abi Talib
 Asad ibn Saman, an early Samanid
 Asad ibn Abd-al-Uzza, early Islamic historical figure
 Khuwaylid ibn Asad, his son, father-in-law of Muhammad
 Asad ibn al-Furat (760–828) a jurist and theologian
 Hassan Assad (born 1973), American professional wrestler better known as Montel Vontavious Porter
 Javier Assad (born 1997), Mexican baseball player
 Muhammad Asad, born Leopold Weiss, influential 20th-century writer and political theorist
 Talal Asad, anthropologist, son of Muhammad Asad
 Mirza Asadullah Baig Khan, a famous Urdu and Persian poet of India
 Sérgio Assad, Brazilian classical composer, guitarist
 Clarice Assad, Sérgio's daughter, a classical and jazz composer, arranger, pianist, and vocalist
 Asad (tribe), an Arabic Adnanite tribe, cousins of Muhammad
 Warqa ibn Naufal ibn Asad, a cousin of Muhammad
 Asaduddin Owaisi, a politician from Hyderabad
 Asad Umar, a Pakistani lawmaker and former politician
 Asad Uddin, 16th-century Bengali poet
 Asad Raza (artist), a Pakistani-American artist 
 Asad Shafiq, a Pakistan Test cricketer
 Mohammed Asad Ullah Sayeed, former IAS officer from Hyderabad
 María de Lourdes Dieck-Assad, Lebanese-Mexican economist

Al-Assad family

The Al-Assad family is an Alawite family from the Latakia region (specifically Qardaha), which has held political power in Syria since 1970. The family has produced two presidents:
Hafez al-Assad, President of Syria 1970–2000
Bashar al-Assad, current President of Syria

Other family members include:
Bassel al-Assad
Rifaat al-Assad
Jamil al-Assad
Maher al-Assad
Bushra al-Assad

See also
Asad (film)
Aslan (disambiguation)
Lake Assad
Al Asad Airbase
Haydar
Lions in Islam
Qaswarah
Shir, a Persian term for 'Lion'

Arabic-language surnames
Arabic masculine given names
Bosniak masculine given names
Lions in popular culture